This is a list of New Jersey Devils head coaches. The Devils had 17 different head coaches since the team moved to New Jersey in the 1982–83, with Jacques Lemaire serving as coach three times and Tom McVie, Larry Robinson, and Lou Lamoriello each serving twice.  

Three coaches have led the team to a victory in the Stanley Cup Finals: Lemaire in 1995, Robinson in 2000, and Pat Burns in 2003. Lemaire is the all-time leader in games coached and wins, while Burns leads in winning percentage (with at least one full season coached).  

Several former players have worked for the Devils as assistant coaches, including John MacLean and Bobby Carpenter, the only men whose names are inscribed on the Stanley Cup as both a player and a coach with New Jersey. MacLean later served as head coach and is the only former Devils' player to serve in that capacity.

On December 26, 2014, after the firing of DeBoer, head coaching responsibilities were split between Adam Oates and Scott Stevens for the remainder of the 2014–15 season, with Lamoriello supervising the team from the bench.

Key

Coaches
Note: This list does not include data from the Kansas City Scouts and the Colorado Rockies. Statistics are correct through the 2020–21 season.

Notes

 The win–loss percentage is calculated using the formula: 
 Since the Devils officially finalized their move from Colorado to New Jersey on June 30, 1982, that is the date that their reign as coach and assistant coach began on the Devils.
 Schoenfeld was suspended for one game during the 1988 Stanley Cup playoffs for verbally abusing referee Don Koharski; general manager Lou Lamoriello filled in as coach for the Devils' 7–1 loss to Boston.
 Although Ftorek was replaced during the 1999–2000 season, he got his name on the Cup when the Devils won it later that same season.
 Robinson was demoted to assistant coach and replaced as head coach in the middle of the 2001–02 season, but the Devils placed his name on the Cup when they won the following season even though he had left before the 2002–03 season even began.
 Pat Burns resigned after being diagnosed with cancer.
 Larry Robinson resigned due to stress-related health problems.
 Claude Julien was fired with just 3 games left in the 2006–07 regular season.
 Brent Sutter quit after two years of a three-year contract, citing a desire to be closer to home in Alberta, with his family and minor league hockey team, the Red Deer Rebels.  Several weeks later, Sutter was announced as the head coach of the Calgary Flames.  Despite the fact that Calgary had to request permission to talk to Sutter, the Devils received no compensation.

References

External links
 New Jersey Devils coaches at Hockey-Reference.com

 
head coaches
New Jersey Devils head coaches